Polynoncus diffluens is a species of hide beetle in the subfamily Omorginae found in Chile.

References

diffluens
Beetles described in 1962